Franck Jurietti (born 30 March 1975) is a French former professional footballer who played as a full-back. He spent most of his career with Bordeaux.

Club career
Jurietti's professional career started at Lyon, having already been part of their youth team. However, he did not get to play a single game and was transferred to Gueugnon at the end of the season. There he achieved promotion to Division 1 for his first year at the club, and on 19 July 1995, he played his first Ligue 1 match against Metz. At the end of the season, Gueugnon were again relegated, and, after one more year in Ligue 2 where they were unable to achieve back promotion, Jurietti left the club to SC Bastia, where he stayed for three years.

In 2000, he was transferred to Monaco where he was never quite able to settle and after 6 months, he was loaned for the rest of the season to rivals Marseille. He returned to Monaco for one more season and had a trial spell with Premier League side Everton in 2003 but did not secure a contract. He then joined Bordeaux, the club in which he has been the most successful so far, winning the championship once (after finishing twice runner-up) and the Coupe de la Ligue twice. He was the captain during the final against Vannes that Bordeaux won 4–0.

His contract expired in 2010, and he was notified by manager Laurent Blanc that it would not be renewed, effectively putting an end to his playing career.

International career
In 2005, after an excellent start of season with Bordeaux, Jurietti was called up by Raymond Domenech for the France national team for the final two 2006 World Cup qualifying matches. After remaining an unused substitute against Switzerland, Jurietti made his international debut on 12 October 2005 during the 4–0 victory against Cyprus, but only came on for the last five seconds in what was to remain his sole international appearance. This makes him the French player with the shortest international career ever, ahead of Bernard Boissier, who had played two minutes for France in 1975.

Style of play
Jurietti could play on both sides of the defence, and was also known to fill in as a midfielder when called upon. He  developed a reputation for being one of the most "dangerous" players in the French league.

Honours
Lyon
Coupe Gambardella: 1993–94

Monaco
Coupe de la Ligue: 2002–03

Bordeaux
Ligue 1: 2008–09
Coupe de la Ligue: 2006–07, 2008–09
Trophée des Champions: 2008, 2009

Notes and references

External links

1975 births
Living people
Sportspeople from Valence, Drôme
Footballers from Auvergne-Rhône-Alpes
French footballers
France under-21 international footballers
France international footballers
Association football defenders
Olympique Lyonnais players
FC Gueugnon players
SC Bastia players
AS Monaco FC players
Olympique de Marseille players
FC Girondins de Bordeaux players
Ligue 1 players
French people of Corsican descent